KSBT-LD, virtual and UHF digital channel 32, is a low-powered  television station licensed to Santa Barbara, California, United States. Founded on April 10, 1998, the station is owned by the R&C Media Group.

History

Originally signing on as an affiliate of the now-defunct America's Store television network, the station later became the Santa Barbara affiliate of the Azteca América network. The station later aired Hispanic religious programming from Tele Vida Abundante after KZDF-LP (channel 8) became an Azteca América affiliate. In August 2007, the station went off the air. One year later, the station resumed broadcasting as a translator of MTV Tr3s affiliate KBEH (channel 63).

On July 21, 2012, Meruelo Media Holdings had reached a deal with KSBT; the station carried MundoFox programming on its main channel from KWHY (channel 22) from Los Angeles.

KSBT-LD2 carries CCTV-News, the English-language 24-hour news channel of China Central Television, China's largest national TV network.

KSBT-LD3 carries the Film and Video Channel (FV), fully supported by WCETV DTV Network.

External links
KSBT-LD

Television channels and stations established in 1998
Low-power television stations in the United States
SBT-LD